Samuel Cosmi (born February 16, 1999) is an American football offensive tackle for the Washington Commanders of the National Football League (NFL). He played college football at Texas and was drafted by Washington in the second round of the 2021 NFL Draft.

Early life
Cosmi was born in Humble, Texas, on February 16, 1999. He is a first-generation Romanian American as his parents, Cornel and Rodica, fled communist Romania in the early 1980s. Cosmi played football at Atascocita High School, where he was named to the first-team All-District 21-6A and second team 6A All-State as a senior. Rated a three-star recruit, Cosmi committed to play college football at Houston over offers from TCU and Memphis but flipped his commitment to Texas after Houston coach Tom Herman was hired by the school.

College career
Cosmi redshirted his true freshman season at Texas. He played in all 14 of Texas's games as a redshirt freshman and started the last 13 at right tackle. He started all 13 games as a redshirt sophomore and was named second-team All-Big 12 Conference. Cosmi considered entering the 2020 NFL Draft, but opted to stay at Texas for his redshirt junior season.

Cosmi started the first eight games of the COVID-19 shortened 2020 season before opting out of the remainder of Texas' games in order to prepare for the 2021 NFL Draft. In a game against the West Virginia Mountaineers that season, he caught a pass thrown to him by Sam Ehlinger and ran 21 yards for a touchdown. He was named first-team All-Big 12 by the season's end.

Professional career

Cosmi was drafted by the Washington Football Team in the second round (51st overall) of the 2021 NFL Draft. He signed his four-year rookie contract on May 13, 2021. Cosmi was named the starting right tackle during training camp and made his professional debut in the opening game of the season. In the second quarter, Cosmi left the Week 5 game against the New Orleans Saints with an ankle injury. Cosmi missed the next four games until he returned against the Carolina Panthers in Week 11. He left that game early due to a hip injury and would eventually be placed on injured reserve on November 29, 2021. He was reactivated to the active roster on December 20 and finished out the season playing in nine total games.

Cosmi underwent thumb surgery following Week 4 of the 2022 season. After missing three games, Cosmi played with a club on his hand in Week 8 but in a reserve role with the Commanders choosing to stick with Cornelius Lucas as the starting right tackle. In Week 13 against the New York Giants, he got his first start at right guard but left in the third quarter with an ankle injury.

References

External links 
 
 Washington Commanders bio
 Texas Longhorns bio

1999 births
Living people
American football offensive tackles
American people of Romanian descent
Players of American football from Texas
Sportspeople from Harris County, Texas
Texas Longhorns football players
People from Humble, Texas
Washington Commanders players
Washington Football Team players
Romanian players of American football